Tonton Zola Moukoko (born 22 December 1983) is a Swedish former footballer who played as a midfielder. He is renowned for being a legendary figure in the Championship Manager video game series.

Career

Early career
Moukoko arrived in Sweden aged seven or nine with his brother Fedo, after they were orphaned. He began playing with Djurgården's youth teams and came to be considered one of the most talented young players in Sweden. Moukoko was granted Swedish citizenship in autumn 1998 and was immediately called into the Sweden U16 squad.

At the time many of Europe's leading clubs were interested in signing Moukoko and in April 1999 he trained with Bologna FC and Empoli.

Derby County
Moukoko joined Derby County as a 15-year-old and featured in the 1999–00 FA Youth Cup. When he signed a professional contract upon turning 17 in December 2000, it was reported that he turned down a competing offer from AC Milan. With Moukoko playing in the youths and reserves at Derby it was thought likely by fans and Moukoko himself that he would break into the first team. However, early in the 2002–03 season he returned to Sweden after suffering family problems and falling out with club management over his study arrangements.

Moukoko trained with Hammarby IF and then spent summer 2003 on trial with Falkirk FC. After he scored in a 3-0 pre-season friendly win over Queen's Park FC on 7 July 2003, the Scottish club's manager John Hughes was reported to have said: "I thought Ton Ton [sic] was brilliant, absolutely brilliant, if you had caught him in training the other day, you couldn't kick his backside, and he's a flying machine. Ton Ton [sic] lightens the place up, he is a great wee smiler and takes pelters from the boys for his hairstyles, but he is a really good kid."

Return to Sweden
England manager Sven-Göran Eriksson and his assistant Tord Grip helped Moukoko to get a contract with Carlstad United BK in the Swedish football Division 2. After a period of inactivity, he then signed a two year contract with IK Sleipner ahead of the 2007 season. After the two years Moukoko began the 2009 season with Syrianska KF in Norrköping.

Atlantis FC
Moukoko moved to the Finnish club Atlantis FC during the 2009 season. He played in 10 games and failed to score as the club were relegated from the Ykkönen.

IFK Lidingö FK
In 2013 Moukoko began playing for IFK Lidingö FK and coaching one of the club's youth teams.

Moukoko retired aged 28, affected by the death of his brother, who had been his manager/agent.

Personal life 
Moukoko was born in Zaire (now DR Congo).

When interviewed for the BBC Radio series Sporting Witness in 2022, Moukoko revealed that he was working as a sports agent in Sweden.

Championship Manager
Moukoko achieved fame through his depiction as one of the best players in Championship Manager, a computer game developed by Sports Interactive. He was frequently telephoned by fans of the game, who have also set up dedicated Facebook groups.

References

External links
 Archive of Facebook page
 Atlantis FC website profile

1983 births
Living people
Democratic Republic of the Congo footballers
Swedish footballers
Democratic Republic of the Congo expatriate footballers
Expatriate footballers in England
Expatriate footballers in Sweden
Association football midfielders
Djurgårdens IF Fotboll players
Derby County F.C. players
Atlantis FC players
Division 2 (Swedish football) players
Democratic Republic of the Congo emigrants to Sweden
Expatriate footballers in Finland
Democratic Republic of the Congo football managers
Footballers from Kinshasa